The  is a railway line in Gifu Prefecture, Japan, operated by the third-sector operator . The line connects Mino-Ōta Station in Minokamo with Hokunō Station in Gujō. It is the only railway line operated by the Nagaragawa Railway. The line was originally operated by Japanese National Railways (JNR). JNR planned to connect the Etsumi-Nan Line and Etsumi-Hoku Line ("Etsumi North Line"), but the plan was never realized. The north line was later succeeded by West Japan Railway Company (JR West), while the south line was taken by Nagaragawa Railway, a newly founded third-sector company, in 1986. As the company name suggests, the line runs along Nagara River. As a consequence of Japan's declining population and frequent natural disasters (such as typhoons and heavy snowfall), the company is facing financial difficulties.

History
The original goal of Japanese National Railways (JNR) was to build a railway line to the Sea of Japan northward through the Nagara River valley. However, due to the resource requirements of the First World War and the Pacific War, this objective was never achieved and only  was ever built. The first section to open was between Mino-Ōta and Minoshi on 5 October 1923. The JNR then proceeded to extend the line progressively northwards until it reached Hokunō in 1934. Although a ¼-mile section of track was laid beyond Hokunō, no further construction on the line was ever undertaken. The line was used by trolley cars. Freight services ceased in 1974.

The picturesque line is now popular with visitors and tourists. Beginning in April 2016, a two-car sightseeing train , which was created by industrial designer Eiji Mitooka, runs weekly services between Mino-Ota and Hokunō. Passengers are served a selection of bento dishes created from locally-sourced seasonal ingredients from Gifu Prefecture.

Stations

Rolling stock
Starting spring 2016, two of the line's Nagara 300 series diesel cars are scheduled to be rebuilt as a Nagara sightseeing train. The rebuilding work on the two cars will be overseen by Don Design Associates, headed by industrial designer Eiji Mitooka.

See also
List of railway companies in Japan
List of railway lines in Japan

References
 This article incorporates material translated from the corresponding article in the Japanese Wikipedia.

External links 
  

Railway lines in Japan
Rail transport in Gifu Prefecture
1067 mm gauge railways in Japan
Railway lines opened in 1923
1923 establishments in Japan
Japanese third-sector railway lines